Kodamata Dam is a rockfill dam located in Tottori prefecture in Japan. The dam is used for irrigation. The catchment area of the dam is 9 km2. The dam impounds about 14  ha of land when full and can store 2000 thousand cubic meters of water. The construction of the dam was started on 1977 and completed in 2006.

References

Dams in Tottori Prefecture
2006 establishments in Japan